Lamar Brandon Stevens (born July 9, 1997) is an American professional basketball player for the Cleveland Cavaliers of the National Basketball Association (NBA). He played college basketball for the Penn State Nittany Lions.

High school career
Stevens attended The Haverford School in Haverford Township, Pennsylvania for his sophomore and junior years. At Haverford, he was named to All-State and All-District teams both years, as well as leading Haverford to two straight state championship runs. During his senior season he attended Roman Catholic High School in Philadelphia where he played alongside future Penn State teammates, Tony Carr and Nazeer Bostick. During his senior year, Stevens was once again named to All-State and All-District teams, as well as All-Philadelphia. Roman Catholic dominated all season, ranking Number 1 in Pennsylvania and top 15 nationally, according to MaxPreps. Stevens scored 20 points on the way to winning the state championship game.

Recruiting
After the season, Stevens was ranked 100th on the ESPN's Top 100 recruits of 2016 and third-ranked overall in Pennsylvania. 

 Honors and Awards
  3x PIAA AAAA All-State (2014, 2015, 2016)
 2016 PIAA Class AAAA State Champions
 2016 Philadelphia Player of the Year by the Daily News
 All-Philadelphia First Team (2016)
 3x PIAA District 12 First Team (2014, 2015, 2016)''

College career

During Steven's freshman season at Penn State, he started all 33 games for the Nittany Lions and was named Freshman of the Week multiple times with teammate Tony Carr. He was named as a First Team All-Freshman by the Big Ten and averaged over 12 points per game his first season. 

Stevens scored a season-high 30 points on January 5, 2018 against Northwestern. As a sophomore, Stevens averaged 15.5 points and 5.9 rebounds per game. He helped the Nittany Lions post a 26–13 record and win the NIT. Stevens was named Most Outstanding Player of the NIT.

As a junior, Stevens averaged 19.9 points and 7.7 rebounds per game. He was named All-Big Ten Conference first-team accolades by the media and second-team honors from the league’s coaches. Stevens was an All-District VII second-team selection by the National Association of Basketball Coaches. After the season, Stevens declared for the 2019 NBA draft but decided to return to Penn State.

On December 16, 2019, Stevens was named Big Ten player of the week after scoring 18 points and collecting 11 rebounds in a victory over fourth-ranked and previously undefeated Maryland. On February 1, 2020, Stevens became the third player in school history to surpass 2,000 career points, scoring 13 points in a 76–64 win against Nebraska. He scored a career-high 33 points on February 8, leading the Nittany Lions to a 83–77 win over Minnesota. At the close of the regular season, Stevens was named to the First Team All-Big Ten by the coaches and media.

Professional career

Cleveland Cavaliers (2020–present)
After going undrafted in the 2020 NBA draft, Stevens was signed by the Cleveland Cavaliers to a two-way contract. He made his NBA debut on December 28, 2020 in a 118–94 win over the Philadelphia 76ers. He scored two points and collected two rebounds in five minutes of action. On February 23, 2021, he scored eight points including the game winner in a 112–111 win over the Atlanta Hawks. On April 14, 2021, Stevens signed a multi-year contract with the Cavaliers.

Career statistics

NBA

|-
| style="text-align:left;"| 
| style="text-align:left;"| Cleveland
| 40 || 0 || 12.5 || .456 || .160 || .725 || 2.4 || .6 || .4 || .3 || 4.1
|-
| style="text-align:left;"| 
| style="text-align:left;"| Cleveland
| 63 || 13 || 16.1 || .489 || .277 || .707 || 2.6 || .7 || .5 || .3 || 6.1
|- class="sortbottom"
| style="text-align:center;" colspan="2"| Career
| 103 || 13 || 14.7 || .479 || .244 || .714 || 2.5 || .7 || .5 || .3 || 5.3

College

|-
| style="text-align:left;"| 2016–17
| style="text-align:left;"| Penn State
| 33 || 33 || 27.8 || .429 || .344 || .767 || 5.5 || 1.7 || .8 || .6 || 12.7
|-
| style="text-align:left;"| 2017–18
| style="text-align:left;"| Penn State
| 39 || 39 || 33.1 || .465 || .319 || .696 || 5.9 || 1.9 || .6 || 1.1 || 15.5
|-
| style="text-align:left;"| 2018–19
| style="text-align:left;"| Penn State
| 32 || 32 || 36.9 || .422 || .220 || .770 || 7.7 || 2.1 || .7 || .8 || 19.9
|-
| style="text-align:left;"| 2019–20
| style="text-align:left;"| Penn State
| 31 || 31 || 31.1 || .423 || .263 || .719 || 6.9 || 2.2 || 1.1 || 1.2 || 17.6
|- class="sortbottom"
| style="text-align:center;" colspan="2"| Career
| 135 || 135 || 32.2 || .435 || .276 || .738 || 6.5 || 1.9 || .8 || .9 || 16.3

Personal life
Stevens is the author of the children's book "Lamar's Climb -- A Journey to Happy Valley." The book, which teaches geography based on his experience and involves people with special needs in the creative process, was distributed at Penn State games.

References

External links

Penn State Nittany Lions bio

1997 births
Living people
American men's basketball players
Basketball players from Philadelphia
Cleveland Cavaliers players
Haverford School alumni
Penn State Nittany Lions basketball players
Small forwards
Undrafted National Basketball Association players